Clinchport is a town in Scott County, Virginia, United States. The population was 64 at the 2020 census. Clinchport is the least-populated municipality in Virginia. It is part of the Kingsport–Bristol (TN)–Bristol (VA) Metropolitan Statistical Area, which is a component of the Johnson City–Kingsport–Bristol, TN-VA Combined Statistical Area – commonly known as the "Tri-Cities" region.

Clinchport was named from its location on the Clinch River.

Geography
Clinchport is located at  (36.674171, -82.747138).

Demographics

At the 2000 census there were 77 people, 31 households and 19 families living in the town. The population density was 113.6 per square mile (43.7/km²). There were 38 housing units at an average density of 56.1 per square mile (21.6/km²).  The racial makeup of the town was 98.70% White, Hispanic or Latino of any race were 1.30%.

Of the 31 households 35.5% had children under the age of 18 living with them, 45.2% were married couples living together, 16.1% had a female householder with no husband present, and 38.7% were non-families. 32.3% of households were one person and 6.5% were one person aged 65 or older. The average household size was 2.48 and the average family size was 3.16.

The age distribution was 26.0% under the age of 18, 6.5% from 18 to 24, 33.8% from 25 to 44, 20.8% from 45 to 64, and 13.0% 65 or older. The median age was 34 years. For every 100 females there were 120.0 males. For every 100 females age 18 and over, there were 128.0 males.

The median household for a household in the town was $31,875, and the median family income  was $36,250. Males had a median income of $21,500 versus $11,250 for females. The per capita income for the town was $10,485. About 8.7% of families and 9.2% of the population were below the poverty line, including 9.1% of those under 18 and none of those over 64.

References

External links

Towns in Scott County, Virginia